Giuseppe Andreoli may refer to:
Giuseppe Andreoli (bassist) (1757–1832), Italian contrabassist
Giuseppe Andreoli (painter) (1720–1776), Italian painter
Giuseppe Andreoli (general) (1892–1945), Italian general